Frederick II (c. 995–1026), son of Thierry I of the House of Ardennes and Richilde von Blieskastel, daughter of Folmar III, Count in Bliesgau, was the Count of Bar and Duke of Lorraine, co-reigning with his father from 1019.

On the Emperor Henry II's death in 1024, he joined Ernest II, Duke of Swabia, in revolt against the new king, Conrad II.  Soon they made peace and recognised the new king.  Frederick died soon after.

He married Matilda of Swabia, daughter of Herman II, Duke of Swabia, and sister-in-law of Conrad.  They had three children:

Sophia, Countess of Bar and Pont-à-Mousson, married Louis, count of Montbéliard
Frederick, his successor
Beatrice, married firstly Boniface, Margrave of Tuscany, and secondly Godfrey III, Duke of Lower Lotharingia; mother of Matilda of Canossa

References

House of Bar
Counts of Bar
Dukes of Upper Lorraine
990s births
1026 deaths

Year of birth uncertain